Adrián Martín Balboa Camacho (born 19 January 1994) is a Uruguayan footballer who plays as a striker for Defensor Sporting, on loan from Argentine club Belgrano.

Career
Born in Montevideo, Balboa came from the youth divisions of Club Sportivo Cerrito, made his professional debut in the 0–1 loss against Villa Teresa on 24 November 2012. He scored his first goal for Cerrito in the Derby against Rentistas on 15 December 2012, it was the final goal in the 88 minute which lead the team win the match.

Balboa after a wonderful season with Cerrito playing 20 games and scoring 6 goals, he brought the attention of various European clubs being interested on him. The young attacker went to Greece, to be tested by Panathinaikos and after a week he signed a one-year loan with the club.

On 5 December, Balboa made his debut for Panathinaikos coming on as a sub in the 3–0 win against Iraklis Psachna.

In 2014, he returned to Uruguay to play for Danubio. He played in two other Uruguayan teams, Liverpool and Villa Teresa before moving to Argentina to join Sarmiento.
After being relegated to Primera B Nacional on 2016-17 season, he joined Patronato.

Career statistics

Honours
Panathinaikos
 Greek Cup: 2014

References

External links
 

1994 births
Living people
Association football forwards
Footballers from Montevideo
Uruguayan footballers
Uruguayan expatriate footballers
Sportivo Cerrito players
Panathinaikos F.C. players
Danubio F.C. players
Liverpool F.C. (Montevideo) players
Villa Teresa players
Club Atlético Sarmiento footballers
Club Atlético Patronato footballers
Club Atlético Belgrano footballers
C.D. Antofagasta footballers
Club Alianza Lima footballers
Racing de Santander players
Defensor Sporting players
Chilean Primera División players
Argentine Primera División players
Super League Greece players
Uruguayan Primera División players
Uruguayan Segunda División players
Uruguayan expatriate sportspeople in Argentina
Expatriate footballers in Argentina
Uruguayan expatriate sportspeople in Chile
Expatriate footballers in Chile
Uruguayan expatriate sportspeople in Greece
Expatriate footballers in Greece
Uruguayan expatriate sportspeople in Peru
Expatriate footballers in Peru
Uruguayan expatriate sportspeople in Spain
Expatriate footballers in Spain